The 1995 Major League Baseball All-Star Game was the 66th playing of the midsummer classic between the all-stars of the American League (AL) and National League (NL), the two leagues comprising Major League Baseball. The game was held on July 11, 1995, at The Ballpark in Arlington in Arlington, Texas, the home of the Texas Rangers of the American League. It was the first All-Star Game held in the Dallas-Fort Worth area, but not the first hosted by the franchise (as the Washington Senators, the team hosted the game in 1962 and 1969).

In this All-Star Game, American League pitchers held National League batters to just three base hits, but all three were home runs.  The game resulted in the National League defeating the American League 3–2.  This is also the most recent All-Star Game to be televised by the ABC television network.

Because of the MLBPA Strike, and the lack of official champions, the leagues chose to designate the managers of the unofficial league champions (teams with the best record at the time of abandonment of the season) as managers for this All-Star Game. The All-Star break that season was actually only two days - because of the strike induced schedule in 1995, there were games scheduled for the next day.  As a result, by the time this game ended, several players had already flown out of Texas to get to where their teams were playing the next day.

There were two color guards participating in the pregame ceremonies.  The Royal Canadian Mounted Police National Color Guard from Ottawa, Ontario, carried the Canadian flag, while the 1995-96 Del Rio (TX) High School ROTC Color Guard carried the American flag.  Country singer Michelle Wright later sang "O Canada", while fellow country singer (and native Texan) Lyle Lovett sang "The Star-Spangled Banner".  Nolan Ryan threw out the ceremonial first pitch.

National League President Len Coleman presented Jeff Conine with the All-Star Game MVP Award in lieu of the Commissioner of Baseball, marking the second year in a row that Coleman presided over the MVP Award presentation.

Rosters
Players in italics have since been inducted into the National Baseball Hall of Fame.

National League

American League

Game

Umpires

Starting lineups

Game summary

Broadcasting
The 1995 All-Star Game was the first Major League Baseball All-Star Game to be televised by ABC since the 1988 edition from Cincinnati. Just like in 1988, Al Michaels provided play-by-play duties for ABC alongside color commentators Jim Palmer and Tim McCarver. Also assisting in ABC's coverage were John Saunders (who interviewed players in the American League dugout), Lesley Visser (who interviewed players in the National League dugout as well as game MVP Jeff Conine), and Rick Dempsey (who interviewed players inside the bullpen at the Ballpark in Arlington). 

The 1995 All-Star Game officially launched the second season for The Baseball Network, which was a consortium that ABC was in partnership with Major League Baseball as well as NBC. As previously alluded to, the inaugural season in 1994 was cut short due to a players' strike that began on August 12 and wound up causing the World Series (for which ABC was due to broadcast) to be cancelled. The strike proved to hurt the long term viability of The Baseball Network. The arraignment between Major League Baseball, ABC, and NBC was originally supposed to run at least through the 1999 season. But instead, both networks announced on June 22, 1995, that they would be dissolving The Baseball Network after that year's World Series.

Footnotes and references

External links
Baseball Almanac
Baseball-Reference.com

Major League Baseball All-Star Game
Major League Baseball All-Star Game
Baseball competitions in Arlington, Texas
Major League Baseball All Star Game
20th century in Arlington, Texas
July 1995 sports events in the United States